Sir Francis Patrick Fletcher-Vane, 5th Baronet  (16 October 1861 – 10 June 1934) was an Irish-born British military officer and aristocrat.  Francis became the 5th Baronet of Hutton on the death of his first cousin, Sir Henry Ralph Fletcher-Vane, 4th Baronet.

Sir Francis was an early aide of Robert Baden-Powell (they both attended Charterhouse School) and was the Scout Commissioner of London before Baden-Powell ousted him from his Baden-Powell Boy Scouts organisation. Fletcher-Vane later founded the Order of World Scouts, the earliest multinational scouting organisation, and is counted one of the founders of scouting in Italy.

As a military officer, he helped expose the murder of several innocent civilians by an officer under his command during the 1916 Easter Rising. In 2016, on the anniversary of the Easter Rising, Sir Francis was commemorated on a postage stamp in Ireland for the strength of character he showed during those troubles.

Early life
Vane was born at 10 Great George’s Street, Dublin 1861 to Lieutenant Frederick Henry Fletcher-Vane (1807-1894), of the 12th Lancers- son of Sir Sir Frederick Fletcher-Vane, 2nd Baronet- and Rosalind, daughter of John Moore, of Prospect House, County Galway, Ireland.

Vane was raised in Sidmouth, Devon, England and educated at Charterhouse School. In 1876, Vane enrolled at the Oxford Military College.

Military career
After military college, Vane was assigned to the Worcester Militia, Scots Guards and for a stint with the Submarine Mining section of the Royal Engineers over the period of 1883-1888.  In 1886, he began residing at Toynbee Hall in East London. That same year he started a 'Working Boys Cadet Corps'.  He became a captain in the 26th Middlesex Rifle Volunteers in 1888. While serving in the Second Boer War (1899–1902), he was appointed a magistrate in 1902.  He was removed from that position for supposedly being too "pro-Boer".  He wrote "The War and One Year After" pamphlet in 1903 criticising the British method of war.  With his follow up pamphlet, Vane was "retired" from the military.

Ireland
At the start of World War I, Vane returned to the Army as a recruiting officer with the rank of Major and was sent to Ireland, attached to the Royal Munster Fusiliers.

During the Easter Uprising, Vane distinguished himself for his courageous conduct in handling of abuses by an officer under his command, Captain Bowen-Colthurst, who had ordered three unarmed civilians shot to death, and had himself killed an unarmed teenager. Vane had been directed to take command of Portobello Barracks defences, Dublin, then garrison for the largely Belfast-recruited Royal Irish Rifles and the Ulster Militia Battalion. On the third day of the Rising, Vane had taken up an observation position in the tower of the Rathmines Town Hall. On returning to barracks he learned that civilian hostages had been taken and later killed there by order of Captain Bowen-Colthurst. They included the well-known pacifist Francis Sheehy-Skeffington and two pro-Union journalists who were misidentified as Nationalists. Bowen-Colthurst had also led a raid against a house allegedly sympathetic to the insurgents, and during this raid he had summarily executed a youth named Coade in the street.

Vane ordered these incidents to be reported to the garrison high command and to British high command. But his superiors covered up the crimes, and removed him from command. Thereupon Vane went directly to London and met with Secretary of War Lord Kitchener and with Maurice Bonham Carter, Principal Private Secretary to the Prime Minister, to expose the murders.<ref name = "Commons">British House of Commons, [http://hansard.millbanksystems.com/commons/1916/aug/01/sir-francis-vanes-position#S5CV0085P0_19160801_HOC_23 Disturbances in Ireland"], hearing held on 1 August 1916 (accessed 31 March 2016).</ref> As a result, Bowen-Colthurst was arrested a week after the uprising, and was charged with murder at a military court-martial held a month after the uprising. The court-martial found Bowen-Colthurst guilty, but insane; he was sent to Broadmoor Hospital for the criminally insane.

Nevertheless, Vane's superior Sir John Maxwell filed an adverse report about Vane, resulting in Vane's dismissal from the army sometime prior to August 1916.

Between military stintsDaily News, Manchester Guardian, Westminster and Truth employed Vane from 1902 to 1904 as a reporter for South Africa.  He was the unsuccessful Liberal candidate for Burton in the 1906 United Kingdom general election.  Following that he became active in antiwar and suffragette campaigns from 1907-1912.  He published two more items:  Walks and Peoples in Tuscany (1908) and On Certain Fundamentals (1909).

Scouting
By 1909, Vane was the Boy Scouts' London Commissioner. He felt that Scouting should be nonmilitary and, through mediation, has reconciled the British Boy Scouts (BBS) with Baden-Powell's organisation (the BBS had formed as the Battersea Boy Scouts and had originally registered with Baden-Powell's organisation but left over perceived militarisation and the nondemocratic nature of the national headquarters). Vane pushed for the Boy Scouts to be more democratic, but his position was eliminated by Baden-Powell's headquarters staff.  In a protest meeting, the London area Scoutmasters voted overwhelming in support of Sir Francis, however Baden-Powell never reinstated him.  Members of the National Service League, a pro-military group, were appointed to Baden-Powell's headquarters. On 3 December 1909, Vane accepted the presidency of the British Boy Scouts, taking several London area Troops with him. The Quakers' Birmingham and Midland Troops also followed, as Vane was key in having Quaker meeting houses sponsor Scouting Troops.

Vane got the Boy's Life Brigade (BLB) to join the British Boy Scouts in a loose federation called The National Peace Scouts in February 1910.Other Youth Programs Author Victor M. Alexieff. SOSSI Journal. Vol. 37, No. 9, September 1982  At the merger the BBS had 45,000 Scouts and BLB had 40,000 members.  With Vane having an Italian summer home, he was able to launch the Scouting Movement in Italy with the Ragazzi Esploratori Italiani in 1910.  In 1911, Vane assisted Augustin Dufresne, a shipowner, to organise a French Scouting organisation.

With the spread of the alternative British Boy Scouts programme throughout the world, Vane informally aligned the various groups as the Legion of World Scouts, the first international organisation, in 1911 then more formally as the Order of World Scouts on 11 November 1911. Vane became the Grand Scout Master of the Order of World Scouts.

Vane put his wealth behind the organisations: providing a London headquarters and financed the organisation, even the manufacture of BBS uniforms. This overburdened his finances to the point of having to declare bankruptcy in 1912. Thus the British Boy Scouts lost their headquarters, source of equipment and uniforms and their leader. Vane continued his involvement with the remnant BBS, as he inspected the Troop of the London Commissioner Percy Herbert Pooley in 1915.

Vane returned to Italy after World War I to find that the Italian Boy Scouts he founded had been mainly absorbed by the National Scouts Corps (Corpo Nazionale Giovani Esploratori Italiani - CNGEI). Some joined in with the creation of the Catholic Association of Scouts (Associazione Scautistica Cattolica Italiana - ASCI) in 1916, later named AGESCI.  He began working with the latter group.  He tried to get Baden-Powell to accept the ASCI as a member of the World Organization of the Scout Movement.  He also try to get the BBS back together with the Boy Scouts Association.  Both of these efforts were without success.  In 1927, he left for the United Kingdom as the Fascists quashed the Italian Scouting Movement, in favour of the Opera Nazionale Balilla (ONB), an Italian Fascist youth organisation. Despite a private letter to Sir Francis Vane 24 April 1933, sympathising with Vane’s worries, the Balilla was an organisation that was publicly highly praised by Baden-Powell, as the application of scouting as part of national education.

Personal life
He succeeded his cousin Sir Henry Ralph Fletcher-Vane as baronet in 1908.
 
His first wife, Anna Oliphant da Costa Ricci, daughter of the Baron Anselmo da Costa Ricci of Portugal, whom he married in 1888, died in 1922. Vane became a Knight Commander of the Order of Christ (Portugal) in 1889. He married his second wife, Kathleen Crosbie in 1927. Sir Francis died in 1934 aged 72, after spending his last year of life in ill health at St Thomas' Hospital in Lambeth.

Further reading
 Francis Fletcher Vane, Agin the governments: memories and adventures of Sir Francis Fletcher Vane'' (London, Sampson Low, Marston & Co., Ltd., 1929)

References

External links
ODNB article by Roger T. Stearn, ‘Vane, Sir Francis Patrick Fletcher, fifth baronet (1861–1934)’, Oxford Dictionary of National Biography, Oxford University Press, September 2004; online edn, May 2006 , accessed 7 April 2008.
Biography at irishidentity.com

Baronets in the Baronetage of Great Britain
Scouting pioneers
Military personnel from Dublin (city)
1861 births
1934 deaths
People educated at Charterhouse School
British Militia officers
People of the Easter Rising
British Army personnel of World War I
Worcestershire Regiment officers
Scots Guards officers
British Army personnel of the Second Boer War
Scouting and Guiding in the United Kingdom
Scouting and Guiding in Italy
People from Sidmouth
People educated at Oxford Military College
Fellows of the Royal Geographical Society
Royal Engineers officers